

sp

spa-sph
Spacol
spaglumic acid (INN)
Span-FF
sparfloxacin (INN)
sparfosic acid (INN)
Sparine 
sparsomycin (INN)
sparteine (INN)
Spasmoject
Spasmolin
Spectamine 
Spectazole 
spectinomycin (INN)
Spectracef 
Spectrobid 
Spherulin

spi

spic-spip
spiclamine (INN)
spiclomazine (INN)
spinosad (USAN)
spiperone (INN)

spir-spiz
spiradoline (INN)
spiramide (INN)
spiramycin (INN)
spirapril (INN)
spiraprilat (INN)
spirazine (INN)
spirendolol (INN)
spirgetine (INN)
spirilene (INN)
spiriprostil (INN)
Spiriva 
spirofylline (INN)
spirogermanium (INN)
spiroglumide (INN)
spiromustine (INN)
Spironazide
spironolactone (INN)
spiroplatin (INN)
spirorenone (INN)
spiroxasone (INN)
spiroxatrine (INN)
spiroxepin (INN)
Spirozide
spizofurone (INN)

spo-sps
Sporahexal (cefalexin)
Sporanox 
Sportscreme
Spravato 
sprifermin (INN)
Sprintec 
sprodiamide (INN)
SPRX 
SPS

sq
squalamine lactate (USAN)

ss
SSD. Redirects to Silver sulfadiazine. 
SSKI

st

sta-ste
stacofylline (INN)
Stadol 
Stahist
Stalevo 100 
stallimycin (INN)
stamulumab (INN, USAN)
Stan-Gard
Stanozide 
stanozolol (INN)
Staphcillin 
Starlix 
Starnoc
Statex
Staticin 
Statobex 
Statrol 
stavudine (INN)
stearylsulfamide (INN)
steffimycin (INN)
Stelazine 
Stemetil
Stemex
stenbolone (INN)
stepronin (INN)
Sterane 
Sterapred
stercuronium iodide (INN)
Steri-Stat 
stevaladil (INN)

sti-sto
stibamine glucoside (INN)
stibosamine (INN)
Stie-Cort 
stilbamidine isetionate (INN)
Stilbestrol 
Stilbetin 
Stilphostrol 
Stimate 
stirimazole (INN)
stiripentol (INN)
stirocainide (INN)
Stop
Stoxil

str-sty
Strattera 
streptodornase (INN)
streptokinase (INN)
streptomycin (INN)
streptoniazid (INN)
streptovarycin (INN)
streptozocin (INN)
Stri-dex
Striant 
Strifon Forte DSC 
strinoline (INN)
Stromectol 
StrongStart
Strontium Chloride Sr-89 
styramate (INN)

su
Su-Tuss-HD

sub
subathizone (INN)
subendazole (INN)
Sublimaze Preservative Free 
Suboxone 
Subutex